Epsilonretrovirus is a waterborn genus of the Retroviridae family. It infects fish. The species include Walleye dermal sarcoma virus, and Walleye epidermal hyperplasia virus 1 and 2.

References

External links
 

Epsilonretroviruses
Virus genera